Collingwood was an electoral district of the Legislative Assembly in the Australian state of Victoria from 1856 to 1958. It centred on the Melbourne suburb of Collingwood, Victoria.

The district of Collingwood was one of the initial districts of the first Victorian Legislative Assembly, 1856. 
It was defined initially as:

Members for Collingwood
The district initially had two members, which was increased to three from 1859, reverted to two after 1877, and was represented by only one member from 1904.

 = by-election

Election results

External links
Map of Electoral District of Collingwood, 1855.

References

Former electoral districts of Victoria (Australia)
1856 establishments in Australia
1958 disestablishments in Australia